"Anonymous" is the 11th television play episode of the first season of the Australian  anthology television series Australian Playhouse. "Anonymous" was written by Pat Flower and originally aired on ABC on 27 June 1966.

Plot
In a moment of tragic irony, a harassed and henpecked businessman, Walter, faces death alone when he has a heart attack.

Cast
 Peter O'Shaughnessy as Walter
 Shirley O'Shaughnessy
 Elspeth Ballantyne
 Gerard Kennedy
 Helen Harper

Reception
The Sydney Morning Herald critic said that "Despite the occasional relevance of Miss Flower's observations, ironic or start... my natural inclination would have been to switch off as soon as I discovered that the play was in fact saying nothing remarkable, while seemingly seeking by every means to produce alarming discomfort for its own sake. Echo chambers, stills, superimposed wavering images, muffled heart throbs, crooked angled shots, the satanic voice of the narrator, were all piled on thickly enough to produce a severe malaise in the viewer, heavily underlining Peter O'Shaugnessy's virtuoso job with protracted death agonies. Again like so many of the snippets of Playhouse, a worthwhile subject for sensitive treatment went astray with verbose dialogue and over stated production."

The Age critic said "it was probably the worst play I have ever seen. It is thin, wretched and witless. Artistically, dramatically and aesthetically it had nothing to commend it. More than all else, it was just unspeakably revolting."

The Sunday The Sydney Morning Herald called it "chilling" where "Flower consolidated her position as the TV playwright of the year... [a] winner... O'Shaugnessy pulls out all stops."

See also
 List of television plays broadcast on Australian Broadcasting Corporation (1960s)

References

External links
 
 
 

1966 television plays
1966 Australian television episodes
1960s Australian television plays
Australian Playhouse (season 1) episodes
Black-and-white television episodes